Sweden has three metropolitan areas consisting of the areas surrounding the three largest cities, Stockholm, Gothenburg and Malmö. The statistics have been retrieved from Statistics Sweden and the statistics released on 10 November 2014. The official land areas for each municipality have also been retrieved from Statistics Sweden, the agency that defines these areas.

Population centers

, Sweden had 2 metropolitan areas with a population of over 1,000,000 people each.

The following table shows the populations of the top ten metropolitan areas.

Metropolitan Stockholm

Metropolitan Stockholm (also known as Greater Stockholm or, in Swedish, Storstockholm), is a metropolitan area surrounding the Swedish capital of Stockholm. Since 2005, Metropolitan Stockholm is defined by official Swedish Statistics as all of Stockholm County. It is the largest of the three metropolitan areas in Sweden.

Metropolitan Stockholm is divided into 5 areas: Stockholm City Centre, Söderort, Västerort of Stockholm Municipality; and the northern suburbs and southern suburbs, which consists of several municipalities.

 km2 Population per km2

Metropolitan Gothenburg

Metropolitan Gothenburg (Storgöteborg or literally Greater Gothenburg), is a metropolitan area surrounding the city of Gothenburg in Sweden. The metropolitan region is located in Västra Götaland County, except for the municipality of Kungsbacka, which is located to the south in Halland County. As of 2005, the municipalities of Alingsås and Lilla Edet were added to the region. The region is often used for statistical measures, and estimates in the 1960s predicted that the region would have about one million inhabitants in the year 2000. The region is the second largest metropolitan area in Sweden after Metropolitan Stockholm.

 km2 Population per km2

Metropolitan Malmö

Greater Malmö (Stormalmö), also known as Metropolitan Malmö is the metropolitan area of Malmö in Sweden. The area is located in Southwestern Scania (Sydvästra Skåne), which is often considered synonymous with Greater Malmö, and it is part of the wider transnational Öresund Region. Besides Malmö, large towns in Greater Malmö includes Lund and Trelleborg, the former of which was the seat of the historical Catholic Archdiocese of Lund.

Since the 1970s, improvements in highways and the regional and InterRegio train networks means the commuting area has grown to include Ystad, Skurup, Sjöbo, Eslöv, Höör, Landskrona and Helsingborg, though only some of these are included in official definitions of Greater Malmö. It's not uncommon to live in Malmö and work either in Ystad or Helsingborg, or vice versa, but these towns have kept their mental allegiance with older divisions of Scania. Commuting across the Öresund has become more common, both through the Øresund Bridge and the HH Ferry route, at which car ferries departs every 12 minutes in summer (every 15 minutes in winter).

Statistics Sweden, which sets the official definitions for all metropolitan areas in Sweden, has changed which municipalities are included in Greater Malmö over time. The most recent change to the definition came in 2006, when Eslöv, Höör, and Skurup Municipalities became part of Greater Malmö, bringing the number of municipalities included from 9 to 12.

See also
 Largest metropolitan areas in the Nordic countries
 List of the most populated municipalities in the Nordic countries
 List of metropolitan areas in Europe
 Stockholm urban area
 Largest urban areas of the European Union

References

External links

 
 
Gothenburg
Sweden